Careful, Soft Shoulders is a 1942 American comedy film written and directed by Oliver H. P. Garrett. The film stars Virginia Bruce, James Ellison, Aubrey Mather, Sheila Ryan, Ralph Byrd and Sigfrid Tor. It was released on September 18, 1942, by 20th Century Fox.

Plot

The attack on Pearl Harbor occurs and America's declaration of war stirs patriotism in Connie Mathers, who until now has been more interested in Washington, D.C. parties and clothes. A comment by shipping magnate's son Tommy Aldrich that people like Connie and him are "useless" to the war effort inspires Connie to prove him wrong.

Offering her services as a spy to sister Agatha's boyfriend Elliott, an army intelligence agent, Connie ends up being approached by a mysterious man who identifies himself as "Mr. Fortune" and assigns tasks to test her, using passages from the book Gone with the Wind as a code. When she meets Mr. Fortune's approval, he has her investigate whether Tommy is an enemy spy. A confused Connie confides in Elliott, but soon he disappears.

After her sister also vanishes, Connie realizes she has been duped by Mr. Fortune, who proceeds to take her and Tommy captive as well. Luckily, she escapes in time to help the military head off an enemy submarine, saving the day.

Cast   
Virginia Bruce as Connie Mathers
James Ellison as Thomas Aldrich
Aubrey Mather as Mr. Fortune
Sheila Ryan as Agatha Mather
Ralph Byrd as Elliott Salmon
Sigfrid Tor as Milo 
Charles Tannen as Joe
William B. Davidson as Mr. Aldrich
Dale Winter as Mrs. Ipswich

References

External links 
 

1942 films
20th Century Fox films
American black-and-white films
American spy comedy films
Films scored by Emil Newman
Films scored by Leigh Harline
Films set in Washington, D.C.
Films set on the home front during World War II
World War II films made in wartime
World War II spy films
1940s spy comedy films
1942 comedy films
1940s English-language films